"Take Poo to the Loo", commonly shortened to "Poo2Loo", was an Indian social media campaign led by UNICEF to combat the country's problems with open defecation. It has been the subject of jokes on social media, prompting public anger.

The Times of India reported that the idea was developed and initiated in March 2013 after a sanitation conference was organised by UNICEF India and the Indian Institutes of Technology as part of the larger Total Sanitation Campaign, which the Indian government launched in 1999.

Poo2Loo calls on Indians to "take the pledge" and show support by signing the following petition addressed to then President Pranab Mukherjee:
Hon'ble President of India,I call on you as Head of State to ensure that India rises to the challenge of ending open defecation. As a citizen of India, I am proud of our country's rich and varied culture; we have a beautiful land. However, over 620 million people do not use a toilet and nearly as many accept this practice. The result is an unacceptable level of filth in our environment. This is why I have chosen to take a stand and raise my voice with that of many other young people. We want our sisters and brothers to survive, grow and develop as healthy individuals in a clean country. We urgently request your help. Together we can change India.

The website of the campaign contains many puns and some unusual media, including a simple educational video game called Toilet Trek. The campaign also produced an official music video. The official mascot of the campaign is antihero "Mr. Poo", an anthropomorphic lump of excrement.

See also
 Community-led total sanitation
 Swachh Bharat Mission

References

External links
 

2013 establishments in India
Internet memes introduced in 2013
Health education in India
Projects established in 2013
Social campaigns in India
Social media campaigns
UNICEF